Lamoille Canyon is the largest valley in the Ruby Mountains, located in the central portion of Elko County in the northeastern section of the state of Nevada, in the western United States. Approximately  in length, it was extensively sculpted by glaciers in previous ice ages.

It quickly descends to a glacial basin now occupied by Lamoille Lake. A nearby granite shelf contains the picturesque Dollar Lakes. Further down the canyon is a large stand of Whitebark pine and the Road's End Trailhead, the high point of Lamoille Canyon Road, which is a National Forest Scenic Byway. This is also the northern terminus of the  Ruby Crest National Recreation Trail, and the start of the much shorter trail to Island Lake.

Road's End is where Lamoille Canyon begins a sweeping turn around the flanks of Thomas Peak, .  The glaciers have deeply carved the canyon, leaving a U-shaped cross section and, high on the side of Thomas Peak, four hanging valleys (including Island Lake).  The road then passes the Terraces Picnic Area (featuring more glacial remnants) and Verdi Peak. A nearby nature trail exhibits the diverse plant life in the canyon bottom.

The canyon continues to descend to its junction with Thomas Canyon, which enters from the south. At the head of Thomas Canyon is Mount Fitzgerald, and at its outlet is the Thomas Canyon Campground. About a mile below the campground, Lamoille Canyon passes through a narrow slot and then drops quickly to its junction with Right Fork Canyon, which also enters from the south. Near this point are Lamoille Falls, Camp Lamoille (available for group rental), and the north face of Mount Gilbert.
In the remaining 3 miles it descends another  and exits the range at the Powerhouse Picnic Area, the site of a powerhouse built in 1913 for the Elko-Lamoille Power Company. It burned down in 1971, leaving only the foundation. Nearby are the communities of Lamoille and Spring Creek.

Panorama

External links 

 
 Lamoille Canyon, information for visitors

Landforms of Elko County, Nevada
Ruby Mountains
Valleys of Nevada
Canyons and gorges of Nevada